Old Town Hall is a classical revival style hall that was built in 1900 by Joseph E. Willard and subsequently donated by him to Fairfax, Virginia.  The hall was added to the National Register of Historic Places in 1987 as part of the City of Fairfax Historic District.

Notes

National Register of Historic Places in Fairfax, Virginia
Colonial Revival architecture in Virginia
Former seats of local government
City and town halls on the National Register of Historic Places in Virginia
Government buildings completed in 1900
Historic district contributing properties in Virginia